Deoclona eriobotryae is a moth in the family Autostichidae. It was described by August Busck in 1939. It is found in Argentina.

The larvae is observed feeding in the fruits of Eriobotrya japonica.

References

Moths described in 1939
Deocloninae